Malacoscylus niger is a species of beetle in the family Cerambycidae. It was described by Per Olof Christopher Aurivillius in 1908 and is known from Peru.

References

Hemilophini
Beetles described in 1908